Fættenfjorden is a small fjord that branches off of the Trondheimsfjord northeast of the city of Trondheim in Trøndelag county, Norway. The fjord is located on the border of the municipalities of Stjørdal and Levanger.

The German battleship Tirpitz was moored here from 16 January 1942 to 29 October 1943. During this time the Royal Air Force attacked the Tirpitz four times with limited success. Due to the heavy amount of anti-aircraft weaponry, both on the ship and in the surrounding area, the RAF lost 17 airplanes and 64 crew members in the attempts.

See also
 List of Norwegian fjords

References

Trondheimsfjord
Fjords of Trøndelag
Stjørdal
Levanger